Thomas Arthur Adderley (7 April 1940 – 5 February 1993) was a New Zealand singer.

Adderley was born in Birmingham, England in 1940. He later managed Auckland's Top 20s club, and in the 1970s was best known as leader of Tommy Adderley's Head Band. He died in Takapuna in 1993 at age 52.

Discography

Studio albums
{| class="wikitable plainrowheaders" style="text-align:center;" border="1"
|+ List of studio albums
! scope="col" style="width:17em;"| Title
! scope="col" style="width:17em;"| Details
|-
! scope="row"| Tommy'''
|
 Released: 1965
 Label: RCA Victor (RPL 3399)
 Format: LP
|}

Live albums

Awards and nominations
Aotearoa Music Awards
The Aotearoa Music Awards (previously known as New Zealand Music Awards'' (NZMA)) are an annual awards night celebrating excellence in New Zealand music and have been presented annually since 1965.

! 
|-
| 1965 || "Like Dreamers Do" || Single of the Year ||  ||rowspan="1"| 
|-

References

1940 births
1993 deaths
People from Birmingham, West Midlands
English emigrants to New Zealand
20th-century New Zealand male singers